Ansley Cargill (born January 5, 1982) is a former professional tennis player from the United States.

Cargill won four singles titles and four doubles titles on tournaments of the ITF Circuit. She reached a career-high singles ranking of No. 90 in May 2003.

In 2006, she won the $50k ITF Hammond, defeating top seed Tatiana Poutchek of Belarus, 6–1, 6–3 in the quarterfinals
and No. 4 seed Tatiana Perebiynis of Ukraine, 6–4, 6–4 in the final.
That year, she also won the $25k tournament in Vancouver where she was defending champion.

On the WTA Tour, she reached one singles quarterfinal at Sarasota, FL in 2003. She defeated world No. 13, Patty Schnyder of Switzerland, in the first round, and world No. 31, Tamarine Tanasugarn of Thailand, in the second round before losing to world No. 22, Nathalie Dechy of France.

She also reached one WTA Tour doubles final at Tokyo, the Japan Open in 2003, with Ashley Harkleroad of the United States, they lost to Maria Sharapova and Tamarine Tanasugarn.

Cargill played nine Grand Slam main-draw events and reached the second round of the 2003 Australian Open, defeating Anabel Medina Garrigues before losing to Venus Williams.

Following her graduation from Duke University, Cargill worked for two years in Equity Sales at the Atlanta office of financial brokerage firm Morgan Stanley. Since then, she works as financial analyst for the Boca Raton based management consultancy firm East Management Services.

WTA career finals

Doubles: 1 (1 runner-up)

External links

References

Living people
1982 births
American female tennis players
Duke Blue Devils women's tennis players
Tennis players from Atlanta
Tennis players at the 2003 Pan American Games
Pan American Games bronze medalists for the United States
Pan American Games medalists in tennis
The Westminster Schools alumni
Medalists at the 2003 Pan American Games